Candice "Candie" Payne (born 19 December 1981) is an English singer and songwriter. She released her debut album, I Wish I Could Have Loved You More, on Deltasonic in May 2007. She is the sister of singer/songwriter Howie Payne, former frontman of band the Stands, and Sean Payne, the drummer of the Zutons.

Early life
Payne was born in Liverpool in 1981. Aged four, her family relocated to New York City before moving back when Payne was 10. Initially shunning music, Payne pursued a career in visual art, attending art college and working in a vintage clothing shop in Liverpool town centre. However, Payne became disenchanted with her studies and, after performing with a friend's band, exchanged her interest for music.

Career
Candie Payne originally began performing with Liverpool band Tramp Attack and Edgar Jones & the Joneses in the early 2000s. She was then introduced to Simon Dine of Noonday Underground with whom she began composing songs.

In 2006, Payne release two singles, "By Tomorrow" and "Take Me". These preceded her debut album, I Wish I Could Have Loved You More, which was released in May 2007. The single version of "One More Chance", produced by Mark Ronson, followed in September of that year.

In November 2007, The Times Magazine looked ahead to Liverpool's year as the European City of Culture in 2008 by featuring Payne on its cover alongside Liverpudlian singer Cilla Black and Abi Harding of the Zutons, who was engaged to Payne's brother Sean – "How Liverpool got its mojo back".

In December 2007, she sang a version of "Oh My God" with Mark Ronson and Ricky Wilson on Friday Night with Jonathan Ross. Soon after this appearance, Ronson asked Payne to appear on his 'Version' tour in 2008. The tour covered the UK, Europe and the US and major festivals including the Glastonbury festival, Global Gathering and the Montreux Jazz Festival.  Payne says it "was an incredible opportunity and I gained so much experience from it.

Style
Payne sings 60s-inspired pop. Soul singers Minnie Riperton and Roberta Flack are among her influences.  Her pet hate is 'over-singing'."

Some fashion writers reflected on Payne's influence, and that of Abi Harding of the Zutons, on Liverpool's "underground band scene", drawing a contrast with the "brassier" style of local WAGs such as Alex Curran and Coleen McLoughlin (wives of footballers Steven Gerrard and Wayne Rooney). Sunday Times Style remarked early in 2008 that the fashionable Korova bar in the city's Fleet Street "is so cool, you can sense Liverpool evolving from a city full of in-your-face show-offs into something far more knowing":

The girls here are different from their brassier neighbours. Yet, if they're indie, they're still a glossy version. Peroxide bobs, red lipstick, polka-dot shirts, good heels ... They are inspired by local success stories such as Abby [sic] from the Zutons and Candie Payne – and united in their dislike of Curran and co ... "Lots of girls think she [Curran] is it, but it's a pretty sad life to be 25 and only go shopping".

Discography

Albums
 I Wish I Could Have Loved You More (2007) No. 56 (UK)

Singles

Guest appearances
 Edgar Jones – Soothing Music for Stray Cats (2005)
 Kevin Ayers – The Unfairground (2007)
 Kings Have Long Arms featuring Candie Payne – "Big Umbrella" (2008)
 Howard Eliott Payne – Bright Light Ballads (2009)
 David Byrne & Fatboy Slim – Here Lies Love (2010)
 The Chanteuse and The Crippled Claw – "Are You One?" (2010)
 The Wild Swans – The Coldest Winter for a Hundred Years (2011)
 The Wild Swans – Tracks in Snow EP (2011)

References

External links
 
 

1981 births
Living people
English women singer-songwriters
21st-century English women singers
21st-century English singers